Séamus "Séamie" Heery (1927 – 5 November 2014) was an Irish Gaelic footballer who played as a right wing-back at senior level for the Meath county team.

Born in Rathkenny, County Meath, Heery first arrived on the inter-county scene at the age of twenty-two when he first linked up with the Meath senior team, making his debut during the 1949 championship. Heery went on to play a key role for Meath, and won one All-Ireland medal and two Leinster medals. He was an All-Ireland runner-up on one occasion.

At club level Heery was a one-time championship medallist with divisional side North Meath. He also played with club side Rathkenny.

His nephew, Mick O'Dowd, was also an All-Ireland medallist with Meath.

Heery retired from inter-county football following the conclusion of the 1951 championship.

Honours

Team

North Meath
Meath Senior Football Championship (1): 1950

Meath
All-Ireland Senior Football Championship (1): 1949
Leinster Senior Football Championship (5): 1949, 1951 (c)

References

 

1927 births
2014 deaths
Gaelic football backs
Meath inter-county Gaelic footballers
North Meath Gaelic footballers
Rathkenny Gaelic footballers
Winners of one All-Ireland medal (Gaelic football)